Vidhya Unni (born 30 June 1990) is an Indian actress, television presenter and dancer who works prominently in Mollywood film industry. She made her acting debut in Malayalam with Dr. Love (2011)

Career 

Vidhya debuted in the Malayalam film Doctor Love. Vidhya was studying, when she received the offer to act in Doctor Love. Her second movie was 3rd generation (3G). She has participated many dance programmes and co-hosted many award shows on television. She anchored Super Chef, a cookery based programme on Asianet Plus.

Filmography

Television

Advertisements
 Fashion Zone Magazine
 Vanitha Magazine
 Karshakasree Magazine
 Rashtradeepika Cinema Magazine
 Grihalakshmi Magazine
 Nana Cinema Magazine
 Mahilaratnam
 Mangalam

Personal life 

Vidhya is the younger sister of actress Divyaa Unni. She did her engineering in electronics and communication from Amrita School of Engineering, Amritapuri. She was working as a software engineer with Cognizant, a US-based software company in Cochin. She has moved to Hong Kong as a part of her software job. She has quoted that if she misses acting and if she gets good roles she will definitely continue acting.

Vidhya married Chennai native Sanjay Venkateswaran in January 2019 and currently resides in Singapore.

References

External links 

Living people
21st-century Indian actresses
Indian film actresses
Actresses from Kochi
Actresses in Malayalam cinema
1990 births
Actresses in Malayalam television
Indian television actresses